Tracklib is a music service that allows producers to sample original music and clear the samples for official use. The platform was founded with the aim to solve legal and ethical issues surrounding sampling and music clearances. The platform has been previously used to sample and clear tracks for commercial releases by J. Cole, Lil Wayne, DJ Khaled, Mary J Blige, Brockhampton, A-Reece among others.

History 
Tracklib is based in Stockholm, Sweden and was originally founded in 2014. After an invite-only beta version in 2017, the music service officially launched to the public in April 2018. In May 2020, Tracklib changed their service to a subscription model.

Services 
The catalog of Tracklib consists of original master recordings and stems. Each track is part of one out of three tiers (Category A, B, or C) which each its purchase and clearance costs. Users can browse and hear all music before downloading it in WAV-format to use in a digital audio workstation (DAW) such as Ableton, Reason, or FL Studio. In 2019, Tracklib developed and launched a technology for users to select and preview loops. Tracklib functions as an intermediary between record labels, publishers, copyright owners, and artists. This allows users to clear all music and purchase a license for official usage of the selected recording(s). The difference with other music services such as Splice and Loopmasters, is that Tracklib only includes original master recordings and stems. All music is previously released and no royalty-free sounds or sample packs are available on Tracklib.

Catalog 
Original master recordings on Tracklib include music from artists such as Bob James, Louis Armstrong, Billie Holiday, Sly and Robbie, Ray Charles, across genres such as jazz, R&B/soul, reggae, classical music, rock music, and hip hop. The catalog also includes previously unreleased recordings by Isaac Hayes.

Releases

 J. Cole - Middle Child (6× Platinum)
 DJ Khaled - Holy Mountain
 Brockhampton - Dearly Departed
 Lil Wayne - Harden
 Mary J. Blige - Know
 Phantogram - Ceremony
 Vic Mensa - Let U Know
Other notable artists with songs containing Tracklib samples are Firebeatz, A-Trak, Young M.A, $NOT & Statik Selektah.

Advisory board 
Tracklib's advisory board consists of producers Prince Paul, Erick Sermon, and Drumma Boy, later joined by producer Zaytoven in 2018 and Scott Storch in 2020. Former Spotify executives Petra Hansson and Niklas Ivarsson joined the advisory board in 2019.

See also 

 Loopmasters
 Splice (platform)
 Grooveshark
 AccuRadio

References

Computing websites
Cross-platform software
Internet properties established in 2012
Project management software
Project hosting websites
Version control